The Percival Gull was a British single-engined monoplane, first flown in 1932. It was successful as a fast company transport, racing aircraft and long-range record breaker. It was developed into the Vega Gull and the Proctor.

Design and development
The Percival Gull was the first aircraft of the Percival Aircraft Company, formed in 1932 by Edgar Percival and Lt. Cdr E.B.W. Leake. It was designed by Percival himself, and was strongly influenced by the Hendy 302, designed by Basil "Hendy" Henderson, that he had previously owned and raced. The new company did not have the facilities to build the Gull, so the prototype was produced by the British Aircraft Company of Maidstone, Kent, and the first 24 production machines were manufactured by Parnall Aircraft of Yate, Gloucestershire. In 1934, the Percival Aircraft Company moved to Gravesend Airport, Kent, where it built its own Gulls, with the last gull built at Percival's new Luton works.

The Gull was a low-wing cantilever monoplane, constructed of wood with fabric covering. The wings tapered outwards in both thickness and chord, with dihedral outboard of the centre section. They were constructed according to Basil Henderson's patent, and folded rearwards at the rear spar for storage. There were split flaps inboard. The fin and rudder were initially very similar to those of the Hendy 302, with a horn balance and a notable nick on the leading edge where that balance met the fin, but this was soon replaced by the final symmetric, elliptical and unbalanced arrangement. The horizontal surfaces were also rounded, and tail plane incidence was adjustable in flight for trim; the elevators were mounted on a common shaft.

Although Gull variants were powered by five different engines, those were all inverted inline air-cooled types driving two-bladed propellers, making for a neatly faired installation. The rear fuselage was of square cross section with a rounded top. The glazed cabin joined smoothly into a raised dorsal fairing, and placed the pilot in front and two passenger seats, slightly staggered behind. Entry into the early models was via the sliding canopy. The main undercarriage was fixed and spatted, each wheel mounted on three struts in the early models; there was a small steerable tail wheel.

The early models could be fitted with one of two 130 hp (97 kW) 4-cylinder engines, the Cirrus Hermes IV, or the de Havilland Gipsy Major. Alternatively, for racing or for pilots desiring more power, the 160 hp (119 kW) Napier Javelin III 6-cylinder engine was an option. The D.2 variants are known generically as the "Gull Four" (not "Gull IV"). That was despite the Javelin 6-cylinder engine in the Gull Four Mk IIA, and that before the war the Gipsy Major-powered variant was known as the "Gull Major". In 1934, one Gull was modified with cabin doors, revised and shorter glazing, and a faired, single-strut main undercarriage. This version was known as the Gull Four Mk III, (retrospectively P.1D), and those refinements were incorporated in all later Gulls.

The final variant was the D.3 "Gull Six", similar to the D.2 "Gull Four Mk III" with the revised canopy and undercarriage, but with the much more powerful 200 hp (149 kW) de Havilland Gipsy Six 6-cylinder engine. This had the same length and span as the Gull Major variants, but was 195 lb (88 kg) heavier and much faster at 178 mph (286 km/h). One Gull Six (VT-AGV) had the cabin replaced with a tandem pair of open cockpits. It was sometimes known as the P.7 "Touring Gull".

Operational history
Gulls sold well to private owners, offering speed and comfort. Others were bought by charter companies, and were used for photographic and newspaper work. Gulls were used, for example, to cover distant but important events such as the Italo-Abyssinian war of 1935. Some were used for company communications, such as Avro Aircraft and Shell. The sole Gull Four Mk III (G-ADOE) was used by Blackburn Aircraft as a test bed for both the Cirrus Major Mks 1 and 2 engines. Gulls were sold abroad, to France, Australia, Japan, Brazil and elsewhere. Two Gulls worked the Karachi-Lahore mail run for Indian National Airways.

Racing and record-breaking

On 9 July 1932, E.W. Percival flew the prototype Gull (G-ABUR) in the round Britain King's Cup Race, averaging almost 143 mph (230 km/h), although a D-series Gull never won the trophy. The speed of Gulls also made them attractive for the long distance flights popular in the 1930s and the Gull, fitted with extra tanks offered a range of 2,000 miles (3,220 km).
 
On 4 October 1933, Charles Kingsford Smith started a flight in a Gull Four (G-ACJV), from Lympne Aerodrome to Darwin, Australia, arriving on 10 December 1933, in a record 7 days, 4 hrs, 44 min.

On 17 June 1935, E.W. Percival piloted a Gull Six (G-ADEP) from Gravesend to Oran (Algeria), returning to Croydon Airport the same day, and was later awarded the Oswald Watt Gold Medal in recognition of this flight.

New Zealander Jean Batten made at least two memorable flights in her Gull Six (G-ADPR). On 11 November 1935, she departed Lympne and flew two legs to Thiès, Senegal. After a 12 hr, 30 min crossing of the Atlantic on 13 November, she arrived at Port Natal, Brazil, and was later awarded the Britannia Trophy. On 5 October 1936, Batten flew from Lympne to Darwin in the record time 5 days, 21 hr, 3 min, then flying on across the Tasman Sea to Auckland to set another total record time of 11 days, 45 min.

On 4 May 1936, Amy Johnson, flying a Gull Six (G-ADZO), took off from Gravesend on a flight to Wingfield aerodrome, Cape Town and back to Croydon Airport in a record 7 days 22 hr 43min.

Military service
One Gull Six (G-ADEU) was evaluated by the RAE, that resulted in an RAF order for the Percival Proctor, a variant of the Percival Vega Gull. About six Gull Sixes were impressed into the RAF and Fleet Air Arm during the Second World War, in the UK, Egypt and India; one of them was Jean Batten's (G-ADPR), as AX866. Blackburn Aircraft continued to use its Gull Four Mk III (G-ADOE), later re-engined with a Gipsy Major engine in private ownership. Similarly, Vickers Armstrongs retained its Gull Six (G-ADFA) throughout the war.

Variants
The P. designations were applied retrospectively in 1947, after the company had become Hunting Percival.

Operators
: Indian National Airways
: Royal New Zealand Air Force
: South African Air Force
: Spanish Republican Air Force
: Royal Air Force
No. 173 Squadron RAF

Surviving aircraft

Australia
 D.30 – D.2 Gull Four airworthy with Donald McGregor Johnston of Bahrs Scrub, Queensland. It was a 1933 King's Cup entrant flown by Edgar Percival was moved to Australia in the 1930s, was damaged in 1956 and stored. It was restored and flown in 1999.
 D.46 – D.3 Gull Six airworthy with Kenneth Alan Holdsworth of Murwillumbah, New South Wales. It moved to Australia in 1939, where with VH-UVA (another Gull Six), it was used as the basis for the Connellan Airways fleet at Alice Springs. Sold into private ownership in 1947, it was restored in 2002.
 D.65 – D.3 Gull Six on static display at the National Museum of Australia in Canberra, Australian Capital Territory.
Belgium
 D.29 – D.2 Gull Four on static display at the Brussels Air & Space Museum in Brussels.
New Zealand
 D.55 – D.3 Gull Six on static display at Auckland Airport in Auckland. It was used by Jean Batten in a world record flight from England to Brazil.

Specifications (D.2 Gull Four, Hermes engine)

See also
Percival Mew Gull

References

Bibliography 

 Ellison, Norman H. Percivals Aircraft (The Archive Photographs Series). Charleston, SC: Chalford Publishing Company, 1997. . 
 Grey, C.G. Jane's All the World's Aircraft 1938. London: David & Charles, 1972, . 
 Jackson, A.J. British Civil Aircraft Since 1919, Volume 3. London: Putnam, 1974. . 
 Jackson, A.J. British Civil Aircraft 1919-59, Volume 2. London: Putnam. 1960.
 
 Harwood, I. "Gull Genesis". Aeroplane Monthly, Vol. 20, No. 6, June 1994.
 Lewis, Peter. British Racing and Record-Breaking Aircraft. London: Putnam 1970. . 
 Moss, Peter W. Impressments Log. (Vol. I–IV). Tonbridge, Kent, UK: Air Britain (Historians) Ltd., 1962.
 Percival, Robert. "A Portrait of Percival". Aeroplane Monthly, Vol. 12, No. 9, September 1984.
 Silvester, John. "Percival Aircraft 1933-1954 (Part 1)". Aeroplane Monthly, Vol. 11, No. 1, January 1983.

External links

 

Gull
1930s British civil utility aircraft
1930s British military utility aircraft
Single-engined tractor aircraft
Low-wing aircraft
Aircraft first flown in 1932